The 1997 Fordham Rams football team was an American football team that represented Fordham University during the 1997 NCAA Division I-AA football season. Fordham finished third in the Patriot League. 

In their fourth and final year under head coach Nick Quartaro, the Rams compiled a 5–6 record. Cory Bailey, Jack Pieracini, Dave Scoblick and Lance Shaw were the team captains; Bill Tierney was named an honorary captain posthumously.

The Rams were outscored 247 to 215. Their 4–2 conference record placed third in the seven-team Patriot League standings. In eight years of league play, this was Fordham's best finish to date.

Fordham played its home games at Jack Coffey Field on the university campus in The Bronx, in New York City.

Schedule

References

Fordham
Fordham Rams football seasons
Fordham Rams football